The ADHD Rating Scale (ADHD-RS) is a parent-report or teacher-report inventory created by George J. DuPaul, Thomas J. Power, Arthur D. Anastopoulos, and Robert Reid consisting of 18–90 questions regarding a child's behavior over the past 6 months. The ADHD Rating Scale is used to aid in the diagnosis of attention deficit hyperactivity disorder (ADHD) in children ranging from ages 5–17.

The ADHD-RS is currently in its fifth version in correlation with the DSM-5.

Overview 
The ADHD-RS, is an 18-question self-report assessment that takes about five minutes to complete. Each question measures the frequency of the behavior, in which the respondent is asked to indicate whether the behavior occurs "always or very often", "often", "somewhat", or "rarely or never". The questionnaire is intended to be filled out by parents and teachers of the child or adolescent. The first nine items ask questions about behavior related to inattention (e.g., "has difficulty organizing task and activities"). The second set of nine items ask questions about behavior related to symptoms of hyperactivity and impulsivity (e.g., "talks excessively"). The last question asks if the behaviors were present before age seven. Some examples of  ADHD behaviors that are measured by the scale includes; difficulty to focus on tasks, organizing, or not being able to pay attention, squirming, fidgeting, always impatient, can't wait for their turn, and often interrupting others. The ADHD Rating scale has impacted the world of clinical psychology by providing an accurate and valid measure that is able to identify the presence of ADHD in children. It is also helpful in identifying the subtype (predominantly Inattentive, predominantly Hyperactive-Impulsive, and Combined) of the disorder.

Development and history
Attention deficit/ hyperactivity disorder (ADHD) is one of the most prevalent neurological disorders found in children.

The ADHD-RS was created by George J. DuPaul, Thomas J. Power, Arthur D. Anastopoulos, and Robert Reid to address the need for an effective evaluation for children and adolescents suspected of having ADHD. The diagnostic criteria were developed through a selection of items from general rating scales such as the Child Behavior Checklist. The list initially contained 14 items and grew to the 18 questions we have today.

The assessment largely serves the purpose of matching parent and teacher observations of ADHD symptoms to DSM-IV criteria of ADHD. It was developed in tandem with the Academic Performance Rating Scale (APRS) to be used as a complementary system of identification for potential behavioral disorders in the classroom. Class performance is still a diagnostic factor though evaluated through the more comprehensive DSM-5 criteria; as children with ADHD are likely to find issue in scholastic performance, personal conduct, and maintaining social relationships.

DSM-IV outlines three subtypes of ADHD: ADHD combined type, ADHD predominantly inattentive, and ADHD predominantly hyperactive-impulsive. The ADHD-RS separates domain scores of "Inattention" and "Hyperactivity-Impulsivity" which ultimately results in three scores for "Inattention," Hyperactivity-Impulsivity", and "Total". DSM-IV also organizes diagnostic criteria into two categories of Inattention and Hyperactivity-Impulsivity, each of which includes nine symptoms. The eighteen questions of the ADHD-RS were written to reflect each symptom of both categories.

With the release of DSM-V, the questionnaire was adjusted to be in line with the new criteria established.

Questionnaire versions 
The four versions ask age-appropriate questions about hyperactivity and inattention in specific settings.
 Home
 There are two home versions — Child (ages 5–10) and Adolescent (ages 11–17). These are intended to be completed at home by a parent or guardian. The questions are specific to situations and activities in the home setting.
 School
 There are two school versions — Child (ages 5–10) and Adolescent (ages 11–17). These are intended to be completed at school by a teacher. The questions are specific to situations and activities in the school setting, such as staying in one's seat or completing schoolwork.

Reliability and validity

Reliability

Validity

Impact
The ADHD Rating Scale has provided a quick and easy assessment for clinicians to use in order to diagnose ADHD according to the DSM criteria. The creation of this assessment also provided a consistent way for clinicians to diagnose ADHD in children. This assessment is used in both clinical and school settings to measure the presence of ADHD as well as the subtype that may be present. The measure can also be used to measure the presence and continuation of symptoms throughout treatment. This assessment has also been used as the basis for studies covering a wide variety of topics related to ADHD.

Use in other populations

ADHD Rating Scale-IV 
The ADHD RS- IV is widely used in the U.S. in English; however, because of the increasing population of Latino-Americans in the U.S., the ADHD Rating Scale was also translated into Spanish to accommodate those speaking Spanish as their first language. Also, many other countries have already translated and validated the ADHD scale into their primary spoken language. According to the Archives of Clinical Psychiatry in São Paulo, the TDAH (Portuguese abbreviation for ADHD) was fully validated in Brazil by the end of 2006.

Limitations
Ratings of ADHD symptoms on rating scales in general are subjective. Teachers and parents may use different subjective criteria to define symptoms, and may not take context of symptoms into account when making ratings. Furthermore, the validity of the ARS is acceptable, but the normative sample used to calculate this statistic was composed of children aged 5 to 14, and thus it cannot be generalized beyond age range.

According to an accuracy study performed Pediatrics Association in 2016, from all scales they examined the ASQ is the most effective scale that can be used to diagnose the disease, due to its high brevity and high diagnostic accuracy. A Manual called "Conners Comprehensive Rating scales", released in 2017, states that results from discriminative validity analysis showed that the accuracy of the scores to be at 78% across all forms used to diagnose the disease.

There are also questions about how well items on the ARS follow explicit DSM criteria. Specifically, one of the hyperactivity items does not specify that in adolescents, thoughts of restlessness are sufficient, rather than excessive behavioral movement. This lack of specification does not map directly onto DSM criteria.

This assessment can be accessed by purchasing the ADHD Rating Scale handbook, which includes copies of the Teacher and Parent versions with permission to photocopy for clinical use.

See also
 Attention-Deficit/Hyperactivity Disorder Investigator Symptom Rating Scale

References

External links
 Society of Clinical Child and Adolescent Psychology
 EffectiveChildTherapy.Org information on ADHD
 Adult ADHD Self-Report Scale)
 The Conners CBRS

Attention deficit hyperactivity disorder
Diagnostic and Statistical Manual of Mental Disorders
Clinical medicine
Questionnaire construction
Screening and assessment tools in child and adolescent psychiatry